The Komeda Jazz Festival and the Krzysztof Komeda Composers Competition has been held in Słupsk, Poland each November since 1995. The festival and the competition is dedicated to the memory of the Polish musician Krzysztof Komeda.

Leszek Kułakowski, jazz pianist and composer, is the initiator of this event and was also the first one to arrange Komeda's music for symphonic orchestra.

References

External links
 Official webpage

Jazz festivals in Poland
Music festivals in Poland
Music festivals established in 1995
Słupsk
Tourist attractions in Pomeranian Voivodeship
Autumn events in Poland
1995 establishments in Poland